Yoro is one of the 18 departments into which Honduras is divided. The department contains rich agricultural lands, concentrated mainly on the valley of the Aguan River and the Sula Valley, on opposite ends. The departmental capital is Yoro. The department covers a total surface area of 7,939 km² and, in 2005, had an estimated population of 503,886 people. It is famous for the Lluvia de Peces (rain of fishes), a tradition by which fish fall from the sky during very heavy rains.

Municipalities

 Arenal
 El Negrito
 El Progreso
 Jocón
 Morazán
 Olanchito
 Santa Rita
 Sulaco
 Victoria
 Yorito
 Yoro

Demographics
At the time of the 2013 Honduras census, Yoro Department had a population of 570,595. Of these, 88.12% were Mestizo, 7.26% White, 3.79% Indigenous (2.92% Tolupan, 0.39% Chʼortiʼ, 0.28% Lenca, 0.09% Nahua), 0.71% Black or Afro-Honduran and 0.12% others.

Economy

The department, historically, is known for harvesting mahogany and cedar trees for exportation. The area also had a cattle industry.

Football players from Yoro

A number of football players are from the department.

Notes

References

 
Departments of Honduras